The 2019–20 Zenit Saint Petersburg season was the 95th season in the club's history and its 24th consecutive season in the Russian Premier League. Zenit are the defending Premier League champions and as such participate in the UEFA Champions League group stage as well as the Super Cup and the Russian Cup.

Season Events
20 June, goalkeeper Igor Obukhov joined SKA-Khabarovsk on a season-long loan.

On 25 June, Zenit announced that Aleksandr Anyukov had retired from playing, and had taken up a coaching role with the club.
On 10 June, Zenit announced that Claudio Marchisio had left the club after his contract was terminated by mutual consent.

On 4 July, Zenit announced the signing of Douglas Santos from Hamburger SV on a five-year contract, the departure of Dmitry Poloz to Sochi for an undisclosed fee, and the loan move of Daniil Lesovoy to Arsenal Tula until the end of the season.

On 5 July, Zenit announced that Mikhail Kerzhakov and Yuri Zhirkov had both signed new one-year contract with the club, keeping them at Zenit until the end of the 2019/20 season.

On 8 July, Zenit announced the signing of Aleksei Sutormin on a 3-year contract, with the option of a 1-year extension, from Rubin Kazan, and the departure of Elmir Nabiullin to Sochi.

On 12 July, Hernani joined Parma on a season-long loan deal, and Yegor Baburin moved permanently to Rostov.

On 13 July, Aleksandr Anyukov came out of retirement to join Krylia Sovetov Samara on loan for the 2019–20 season.

On 18 July, Aleksandr Yerokhin extended his contract with Zenit for another three-years. The following day, 19 July, Andrei Mostovoy moved to Sochi on a season-long loan deal.

On 23 July, Zenit announced the return of Aleksandr Vasyutin on a four-year contract from Sarpsborg 08

On 2 August, Zenit announced the signing of Malcom on a five-year contract from Barcelona.

On 5 August, Zenit announced that Christian Noboa had left the club to sign for Sochi on a permanent transfer, with Anton Zabolotny making the same move three days later.

On 12 August, Luka Đorđević left Zenit to sign for Lokomotiv Moscow on a permanent transfer.

On 21 August, Zenit announced the signing of Danil Krugovoy on a five-year contract from FC Ufa, with the defender staying in Ufa on loan for the remainder of the season.

On 29 August, Zenit announced the signing of Vladimir Khubulov on a season-long loan from Akhmat Grozny.

On 31 August, Zenit announced the arrival of Yordan Osorio on a season-long loan deal from Porto, with the option to make the move permanent at the end of the season.

On 2 September, Vyacheslav Karavayev signed for Zenit on a four-year contract from Vitesse, and Emiliano Rigoni moved to Sampdoria on loan until the end of season, with an option to make the move permanent at the end of the season, and Miha Mevlja moved to Sochi on a permanent transfer.

Also on September, Denis Terentyev extended his contract with Zenit for an additional year, and joined Ufa on loan for the remainder of the season.

On 21 January, Kokorin scored a hat-trick for Zenit in their 10–0 victory over Qatar club Al Uwaynah, before PFC Sochi announced they had signed Kokorin on loan until the end of the season.

On 24 January, Matías Kranevitter left Zenit by mutual consent.

On 1 February, Zenit announced the return of Emiliano Rigoni from his loan deal with Sampdoria.

On 12 February, Maksim Rudakov left Zenit to sign for Rostov.

On 17 February, Zenit confirmed that Kokorin had join Sochi on loan for the remainder of the season.

On 16 March, Zenit's away game against CSKA Moscow scheduled for 22 March, was postponed after the Mayor of Moscow banned outdoor sporting events due to the COVID-19 pandemic.

On 17 March, the Russian Premier League postponed all league fixtures until April 10 due to the COVID-19 pandemic.

On 1 April, the Russian Football Union extended the suspension of football until 31 May.

On 15 May, the Russian Football Union announced that the Russian Premier League season would resume on 21 June.

Squad

Out on loan

Transfers

In

Loans in

Out

Loans out

Released

Friendlies

Competitions

Super Cup

Premier League

Results by round

Results

League table

Russian Cup

Final

UEFA Champions League

Group stage

Squad statistics

Appearances and goals

|-
|colspan="14"|Players away from the club on loan:

|-
|colspan="14"|Players who left Zenit during the season:

|}

Goal Scorers

Clean Sheets

Disciplinary record

References

FC Zenit Saint Petersburg seasons
Zenit Saint Petersburg
Zenit St.Petersburg
Russian football championship-winning seasons